Thuận An is a commune in Bình Minh, Vĩnh Long province, Vietnam.

The commune covers area of 20,04 km² and in 2012 its population was 16.368, with population density of 816 citizens/km².

References

Populated places in Vĩnh Long province